Carpatho-Ruthenians or Carpathian Ruthenians may refer to:

 inhabitants of the historical region of Carpathian Ruthenia in general
 Carpatho-Ruthenian Slavs, including Carpatho-Ruthenian Rusyns and Ukrainians from Carpathian Ruthenia
 Carpatho-Ruthenian Jews, Jews from Carpathian Ruthenia
 Carpatho-Ruthenian Hungarians, Hungarians from Carpathian Ruthenia

See also
 Carpatho-Ruthenian (disambiguation)
 Ruthenian (disambiguation)
 Ruthenia (disambiguation)